Limelight, formerly ABC Radio 24 Hours, or simply 24 Hours, is an Australian digital and print magazine focusing on music, arts and culture. It is based in Sydney, New South Wales. Originally published by the Australian Broadcasting Corporation (ABC), after several changes of ownership it is  owned by Limelight Arts Media Pty Ltd.

History 
Founded in January 1976, the magazine was originally published under the name ABC Radio 24 Hours, or simply 24 Hours, and relaunched as Limelight in June 2003.

Ownership
The magazine was originally a subsidiary of the ABC's classical music radio station, ABC Classic FM, and existed primarily to provide program details for the station's listeners. The title 24 Hours came to the inaugural Director of ABC FM, Christopher Symons, "literally in the middle of the night. It also occurred to me... that if we got the magazine and its title established, it would be difficult for management to cut the station back to 18 hours a day".

From 2006 to January 2014 it was published by Haymarket Media Group under licence from the ABC. From February 2014 ownership was transferred from ABC to Arts Illuminated Pty Ltd.

In March 2018 Limelight was purchased by Limelight Arts Media Pty Ltd. In 2018 Cara Anderson was appointed CEO.

Content change and relaunch
In January 2012, the magazine ceased listing detailed ABC Classic FM radio programs for the forthcoming month. This reflected a decision by ABC management to end forward programming, to allow greater flexibility. Under editor Francis Merson, Limelight was awarded the Relaunch of the Year prize at the 2012 Publishers Australia Excellence Awards. This was in recognition of the magazine's successful relaunch in June 2012, with a new design and greater editorial focus on contemporary music and reviews. Francis Merson also earned runner-up in Editor of the Year category.

Description and management
The magazine publishes articles which include reviews, news, interviews, and artist profiles, as well as event and listening guides, focusing on  music and the performing arts. These are published both on its website and in 11 print magazines each year. It still includes highlights from ABC Classic, as the radio station is now called. 

 Jo Litson is editor and Cara Anderson is CEO.

Limelight Awards 
Between 2007 and 2012, Limelight held the Limelight Awards – the only classical music awards in Australia where the public were invited to vote and help recognise well-loved musicians.

Editors
Francis Merson, 2008–2013; runner-up in the 2012 Publishers Australia Excellence Awards for 'Editor of the Year' (below 20k circ.)

Clive Paget, 2015–2018;  based in New York City as editor-at-large

Jo Litson, from late 2018 to present, having joined the magazine as Deputy Editor in 2016 and taking over editing as of the November 2017 issue.

Notable issues

Acoustics survey 
The September 2011 issue of Limelight featured an in-depth survey of musicians to reveal the best (and worst) concert hall acoustics in Australia's 20 major concert halls, for orchestral, chamber and vocal music. The survey, which gathered opinions from 200 performers, critics and audience members, ranked the Perth Concert Hall as the best overall venue and the Melbourne Recital Centre as the top venue for chamber music. The Sydney Opera House's Joan Sutherland Theatre (previously known as the Opera Theatre) was found to have the worst acoustics.

Australian orchestra ranking 
Featured in the April 2013 issue of Limelight, a panel of 15 expert critics and professional musicians from around the country were blind-tested to determine Australia's top symphony orchestra. Whenever possible, repertoire was matched to ensure comparable adjudication and a fair result. In the test, each of the 15 judges was sent recordings of each orchestra on separate CDs labelled simply A to F. Ranking the orchestras from 1 to 6, the expert panel voted the Sydney Symphony Orchestra, the Adelaide Symphony Orchestra and the Queensland Symphony Orchestra in the three top spots. The Melbourne Symphony Orchestra was ranked in fourth place.

References

External links

Classical music magazines
Music magazines published in Australia
Monthly magazines published in Australia
Magazines established in 1976
1976 establishments in Australia
Magazines published in Sydney
Visual arts magazines